The Men's 1500 metres T13 event at the 2016 Summer Paralympics took place at the Estádio Olímpico João Havelange 11 September. Notably, the top four finishers have all unofficially beaten the winning time of the Men's 1500 metres in the Olympics in the same year in the same venue, which was won by Matthew Centrowitz Jr. with the time of 3:50.00.

Results

T12/13
Competed 11 September 2016 at 23:32.

References

Athletics at the 2016 Summer Paralympics
2016 in men's athletics